(born 14 March 1978) is a Japanese former professional tennis player.

Okamoto took part in the 2006 Bangalore Open but lost in the first round of singles qualifying, and the first round of doubles, alongside Ryōko Fuda. She has stated that her favorite surface to play on is hardcourt.

In her career, Okamoto won one doubles title on the WTA Tour, as well as two singles and 15 doubles titles on the ITF Women's Circuit.

WTA career finals

Doubles: 1 (1 title)

ITF Circuit finals

Singles: 10 (2–8)

Doubles: 33 (15–18)

References
 
 

1978 births
Living people
Japanese female tennis players
Universiade medalists in tennis
People from Tokyo
Universiade bronze medalists for Japan
Medalists at the 1999 Summer Universiade
20th-century Japanese women
21st-century Japanese women